Gozmanyita is a genus of moths in the family Geometridae.

Distribution
China.

References

Geometridae